Duhonw is a rural community in Powys, Wales, to the south of Builth Wells, in the historic county of Breconshire. Llangammarch Wells' is to its west.

Its population was 294, according to the 2011 census; a 2% fall since the 300 people noted in 2001.

The 2011 census showed 14.6% of the population could speak Welsh, a rise from 9.2% in 2001.

Duhonw Community Council was created following a 1985 review by the Local Government Boundary Commission for Wales, amalgamating the four small communities of Llanddewi'r Cwm, Llangynog, Llanynis and Maesmynis.

Duhonw is part of the Sennybridge Training Area, and is listed as a Site of Special Scientific Interest.

See also
Buellt

References

See also
List of Sites of Special Scientific Interest in Brecknock

Sites of Special Scientific Interest in Brecknock